Alan Parley known by the artistic name Hostage is a Scottish electronic music producer based in Edinburgh, Scotland. He is currently signed to British talent agency Primary Talent International and is affiliated with various record labels, most notably Black Butter Records.

Discography

Albums
2000: Money Well Spent

EPs
2009: Valhalla EP
2010: Versatile Sound EP
2010: Roll EP
2010: Dub My Disco
2011: Witches 
2013: How We Go Down EP
2014: Who Leads Us EP
2018: FML EP 
2018: River EP

References

External links
Hostage page on Discogs

1977 births
Living people
Musicians from Edinburgh
Scottish electronic musicians